The Price-Pottenger Nutrition Foundation (PPNF) is a U.S. 501(c)(3) non-profit organization established "to teach the public and professionals about foods, lifestyle habits, healing modalities, and environmental practices."

History 
Founded in 1952, it was first known as the Santa Barbara Medical Research Foundation and later renamed the Weston A. Price Memorial Foundation, in 1965, after the 20th century researcher Weston A. Price who emphasized the importance of nutrition for health and dentistry. The other half of the foundation's current namesake is Francis M. Pottenger, Jr. whose study of nutrition in cats sparked interest in a diet high in raw animal products including uncooked meats and unpasteurized dairy.  In 1969, after Pottenger's death, the organization became the Price Pottenger Foundation, and then the Price Pottenger Nutrition Foundation in 1972.

PPNF primarily advocates: 1) that consumption of animal fats is not dangerous to human health, and 2) that mainstream agricultural methods which emphasize the use of synthetic fertilizers and pesticides as well as factory farming and significant processing of whole foods, reduces overall nutritional quality of food and human health.

PPNF now houses over 10,000 books and publications, including the works of Dr. Royal Lee, Dr. Melvin Page, Dr. Emanuel Cheraskin, Dr. William Albrecht, and others.  It owns and protects the  copyright to the works by Price  and Pottenger. They continue to republish Price's Nutrition and Physical Degeneration, and Pottenger's Pottenger's Cats – A Study in Nutrition.

Key individuals

Weston A. Price

Price was a dentist from Cleveland, Ohio, whose 1939 book, Nutritional and Physical Degeneration, describes the fieldwork he did in the 1920s and 1930s  among various world cultures, with the original goal of recording and studying the dental health and development of pre-industrial populations.

Francis M. Pottenger, Jr.

Pottenger was a doctor whose 1932-1942 Pottenger Cat Study addressed the nutritive value of heat-labile elements — nutrients destroyed by heat and available only in raw foods. He used donated laboratory cats to test the potency of the adrenal extract hormones he was making. The adrenal glands of these cats were removed for the experiments, usually resulted their death. But  Pottenger noted that most of the cats died during or following the operation.  He was feeding the cats a supposedly nutritive diet consisting of raw milk, cod liver oil and cooked meat scraps of liver, tripe, sweetbread, brains, heart and muscle. When the number of donated cats exceeded the supply of food available, Pottenger began ordering raw meat scraps from a local meat packing plant, including organs, meat, and bone; and fed a separate group of cats from this supply.  Within months this separate group appeared in better health than the cooked meat group. Pottenger conducted subsequent studies involving approximately 900 cats over a period of ten years, with three generations of cats studied.  His experiments showed that cats were healthiest after being fed raw meat and raw dairy.

Pat Connolly
Marion Patricia ("Pat") Connolly was the curator for PPNF.  She studied health and nutrition for over 66 years and lectured on a variety of nutritional subjects.  According to the PPNF, she was the foremost authority on the work of Price and Pottenger.  In 1962 she took a course on nutrition by Alfreda Rooke, then Curator of PPNF, who had studied under Price.  In 1972, she became a PPNF Nutrition Instructor, teaching Rooke's course.  She wrote several books, including Dietotherapy (The Kelley Research Foundation), Mini Guide To Living Foods, The Guide to Living Foods (PPNF), Food Alive (Livingston-Wheeler Medical Clinic), A Modern Approach to the Primitive Diet (Nero), and The Candida-Albicans Yeast-Free Cookbook (McGraw Hill).  She was also listed as a co-author of the first edition of Nourishing Traditions.  She died in November 2010.

George Meinig
In 1994 George E. Meinig published Root Canal Cover-up Exposed which resurrected Price's old studies.  Regarding the book, Hasselgren in New York Academy of Dentistry's Annals of dentistry stated "[t]he focal infection theory, supported by many including Dr. Price, has been attacked, debated, accepted, criticized, agreed upon, etc. but it has not been covered up." Hasselgren noted that Meinig would sometime confuse the meanings of "infection" and "inflammation" and based all his work on Price's 1923 Dental Infections, Oral and Systemic book.  Hasselgrenalso  observed: "the work of Dr. Weston Price is therefore still to a great extent valid and important and the role of infection can not be underestimated." Meinig died in May 2008 at the age of 93.

Publications and education
The PPNF houses an archive of books related to Price and Pottenger's work as well as the works of authors in related fields.  It publishes its own journal, the Journal of Health and Healing. They also sell a variety of books, DVD, and CDs, publish an online newsletter, and offer classes.

See also
Alternative medicine
Focal infection theory
Nutrition
Saturated fat and cardiovascular disease controversy
Weston A. Price

References

External links
 Price-Pottenger Nutrition Foundation website

Organizations established in 1999
Health advocacy groups
Agricultural economics
Alternative medicine organizations
Food politics
Medical and health foundations in the United States
Organic farming organizations
Nutrition organizations
1999 establishments in California